Abdullah Shaher Matalkeh Abrahem (born March 8, 1991) is a Qatari professional basketball player.  He currently plays for Al Rayyan Doha of the Qatari Basketball League and the FIBA Asia Champions Cup.

He represented Qatar's national basketball team at the 2016 FIBA Asia Challenge in Tehran, Iran.

References

External links
 Asia-basket.com Profile
 2016 FIBA Asia Challenge Profile
 2015 FIBA Asia Championship Profile

1991 births
Living people
Forwards (basketball)
Centers (basketball)
Qatari men's basketball players
People from Doha
Basketball players at the 2010 Asian Games
Asian Games competitors for Qatar